1954 Kumbh Mela "stampede"  was a major crowd crush that occurred on 3 February 1954 at Kumbha Mela  in Allahabad in Uttar Pradesh state in India.  It was the main bathing day of Mauni Amavasya (New Moon), when the incident took place. During the festival 4–5 million pilgrims had taken part that year, which was also the first Kumbh Mela after the Independence.
 
The figures for the tragedy varied according to different sources. While The Guardian reported more than 800 people dead and over 100 injured,  TIME reported "no fewer than 350 people were trampled to death and drowned, 200 were counted missing, and over 2,000 were injured". According to the book Law and Order in India over 500 were dead.

Reasons and aftermath 
 
The occasion of 1954 Kumbh Mela was used by politicians to connect with the Indian populace prior to India's Independence, and as this was the first Kumbh Mela after Independence, with more than 5 million pilgrims in Allahabad for the 40-day festival, many leading politicians had visited the city during the event. Compounding the failure of crowd control measures was not just the presence of a large number of politicians, but also the fact that the Ganges River had changed course and moved in closer to the Bund (embankment) and the city, reducing the available space of the temporary Kumbh township and restricting movement of the people. Ultimately what triggered the tragedy was that a surge of the crowd broke through the barriers separating them from a procession of sadhus and holy men of various akharas, resulting in the fatal crush.

After the event, Prime Minister Jawahar Lal Nehru suggested that politicians and VIPs should refrain from visiting the Mela, who were all but exonerated along with the government of any wrongdoing after an inquiry. Not a single rupee of compensation was paid to the victims' families. The judicial inquiry commission, set up after what was one of the worst crowd crushes in India's history, was headed by Justice Kamala Kant Verma, and its recommendations became the basis for better management of future events in the coming decades. This tragedy has stood as a grim reminder to Mela planners and district administrators as crowds have progressively increased, so much so that 80–100 million people took part in the 2010 Kumbh Mela, making it the largest gathering anywhere in the world. Among the other fatal Kumbh Mela crushes, the most notable have been in the years 1840, 1906, 1954, 1986, 2003 (39 deaths), 2010 (7 deaths) and in 2013 (36 deaths).

In popular culture
There is a reference to the 1954 Kumbh Mela Stampede in the 1993 novel A Suitable Boy by Vikram Seth. In the novel, the event is called "Pul Mela" instead of "Kumbh Mela". It is also depicted (again as "Pul Mela"), in the 2020 television adaptation.
In the novel written by Kalkut (Samaresh Basu), Amrita Kumbher Sandhane, the tragedy of the stampede is highlighted along with reaction of the pilgrims. It was later made into a film.

See also
2013 Kumbh Mela stampede

References 

History of Uttar Pradesh (1947–present)
Disasters in Uttar Pradesh
Kumbh Mela Stampede, 1954
History of Allahabad
Accidental deaths in India
Human stampedes in India
Kumbh Mela Stampede, 1954
Kumbh Mela
Nehru administration